is a 2018 Japanese crime and yakuza film directed by Kazuya Shiraishi.

Plot
1988, Hiroshima, Japan. Shūichi Hioka (Tori Matsuzaka) gets assigned to the second investigative unit under Shōgo Ōgami (Kōji Yakusho), a detective rumored to have mob ties, and he is put in charge of the missing person case for an employee at a yakuza-affiliated finance company. Hioka confronts ruthless gang thugs while harboring doubts about the law-breaking Ogami.

Cast
East Kurehara Police
 Kōji Yakusho as Shōgo Ōgami
 Tori Matsuzaka as Shūichi Hioka
 Kenichi Yajima
 Tomorowo Taguchi
Hiroshima Prefectural Police
 Kenichi Takitō as Daisuke Saga
Odani-gumi 
 Yōsuke Eguchi as Moritaka Ichinose
 Goro Ibuki as Kenji Odani
 Tomoya Nakamura as Kyōji
 Taketo Tanaka as Takashi
Irako-kai
 Renji Ishibashi as Shōhei Irako
Kakomura-gumi 
 Kyūsaku Shimada as Kakomura
 Yutaka Takenouchi as Nozaki
 Takuma Oto'o as Yoshida
 Katsuya as "Sekitori"
Takii-gumi 
 Pierre Taki as Ginji Takii
Aki Shimbun
 Nakamura Shidō II as Takafumi Kōsaka
Others
 Yōko Maki as Rikako Takagi
 Junko Abe as Momoko Okada
 Taro Suruga as Jirō Uesawa
 Megumi as Junko Uesawa
 Joey Iwanaga as Daiki Zenda

Awards

Sequel
Last of the Wolves (2021)

See also
Cops vs. Thugs (1975 film)

References

External links
 

2010s Japanese films
2010s Japanese-language films
Films directed by Kazuya Shiraishi
Toei Company films
Japanese crime drama films
2010s crime drama films
Yakuza films
Films based on Japanese novels
Films set in the 1980s
2018 drama films